Michael Lampert (born 17 July 1972) is an Austrian ice hockey player. He competed in the men's tournament at the 1998 Winter Olympics.

References

External links
 

1972 births
Living people
Olympic ice hockey players of Austria
Ice hockey players at the 1998 Winter Olympics
Sportspeople from Vorarlberg
People from Bregenz District